Alfred B. Fairfax (1843 – March 1, 1916) was an American politician.  He was born in Virginia. He served in the Union Army during the American Civil War. He became active in the Republican Party. He served in the Kansas House of Representatives during the 1888 - 1889 term, representing Chautauqua County.

He owned a cotton farm and was a pastor at the New Hope Baptist Church in Parsons, Kansas. A photograph of Fairfax survives.

See also
African-American officeholders during and following the Reconstruction era

References

External links
Findagrave entry

1843 births
1916 deaths
Republican Party members of the Kansas House of Representatives
Union Army soldiers
Baptist ministers from the United States
People from Chautauqua County, Kansas
People from Parsons, Kansas